The Keller House in Hazleton, Pennsylvania was a historic house that was listed on the National Register of Historic Places. It was removed from the National Register in 1978. It was acquired by the Pennsylvania Historical and Museum Commission in 1978 after a $60,000 grant from the United States Department of the Interior.

See also 

 National Register of Historic Places listings in Luzerne County, Pennsylvania

References 

Former National Register of Historic Places in Pennsylvania
Houses on the National Register of Historic Places in Pennsylvania
Houses completed in 1854
Houses in Luzerne County, Pennsylvania
National Register of Historic Places in Luzerne County, Pennsylvania